The IV World Rhythmic Gymnastics Championships were held in Varna, Bulgaria from the 27 to 29 September 1969.

Competitors
There were participants from 18 countries - Bulgaria, Soviet Union, Hungary, Czechoslovakia, Romania, East Germany, West Germany, Cuba, Poland, North Korea, Yugoslavia, Sweden, Denmark, France, Belgium, the Netherlands, Italy and Japan.

Individuals

Freehand

Hoop

Rope

Ball

All-Around

Groups

References 

Rhythmic Gymnastics World Championships
World Rhythmic Gymnastics Championships, 1969
1969 in gymnastics
International gymnastics competitions hosted by Bulgaria